The pond smelt (Hypomesus olidus) is a fresh and brackish water species of smelt. It is found in the East Asia (eastern Siberia, northeast China, Korea, Hokkaido) and the northwestern North America (Alaska, northwestern Canada). It can grow to  total length.

References

Hypomesus
Fish of the Pacific Ocean
Freshwater fish of the Arctic
Freshwater fish of Asia
Freshwater fish of North America
Freshwater fish of China
Fish of Japan
Fish of Korea
Fish of Russia
Freshwater fish of the United States
Fish described in 1814
Taxa named by Peter Simon Pallas